Claire Dowie (born 1957 Birmingham, England, United Kingdom) is an English writer, director, practitioner and actress. She was a pioneer of Stand-up Theatre in England. She is a writer for In-yer-face theatre.

Originally she wanted to be a dancer, and toured briefly with a group in Europe. She then moved into comedy. The real breakthrough came when she started writing. Her plays have been translated into German, Spanish, Portuguese and Italian. Recently she published her first novel, Chaos.

Theatre 
Dowie's plays explore the themes of gender roles and sexuality. Among her most famous pieces of work are Adult Child / Dead Child, (awarded the Time Out Theatre Award in 1988), Why is John Lennon wearing a skirt? (winner of the London Fringe Award 1991), Drag Act, Easy Access (for the boys) and H to He – I'm turning into a man. She has published two books of her plays.

Why is John Lennon Wearing A Skirt? 
This play follows the story of a 14-year-old girl who wears trousers and would rather play football than share the sudden awakening interests of her friends. Claire Dowie says of her piece: "It's about growing up in the late 60s and early 70s. It's my time, but not necessarily my story. It was the beginning of the feminist movement – bra burning, etc., they just started. Mental one was torn between 'Man from UNCLE' and 'Batman': All the girls had as a role model was Barbie." The play was enacted at many German theatres.

Premiere: Traverse Theatre Edinburgh 1990

Adult Child/Dead Child 
Written in 1987
Adult Child/Dead Child is the story of a young person growing up with their parent's impossibly high standards – "One hundred percent do it right, do it the best, be brainy, be talented, be sporty, be good, academic athlete, well-mannered, is considered a friend at first until a cruel comment from neighbours results in Benji prompting the child to throw a brick through the neighbours' window. It is at this point that the child declares Benji a "monster, and a horror and a terror." Throughout childhood, Benji is kept a secret, even throughout therapy sessions for fear of ending up in "The Snake Pit". Eventually, in the second half of the monologue, the child leaves home and is forced to face a world which expects them to behave in an adult manner, despite their feelings that they are still a child and thus need the support of one. Eventually, due to Benji causing trouble, the child is sectioned and begins to shake off Benji and their fears and begins to live on their own in the "adult" manner which so confused them before, although at the end it is left ambiguous as to whether the character has made a full recovery.

Premiere: Finborough Theatre Club, London 1987.

Hardworking Families
Written in 2015
This play focuses on the differences between an unemployed mother and a mother who is a CEO of a business. Politicians often talk about getting jobs and lives of the British Public slowly fall apart. The play was a response to Dowie hearing Politicians in the Media repeating the phrase "Hard Working Families" which lead her to question what makes a family hard working.

The original version was written for a large cast after several years of being a Patron and audience for the Birmingham-based Youth Theatre Stage2, whom Dowie gave the first rights to perform at the Crescent Main House Theatre in Birmingham (January 2016).

Selected works

Plays 
Adult Child/Dead Child, Finborough Theatre, London, 1987
All Over Lovely, Drill Hall, London, 1997
Cat And Mouse, 1986
Death and Dancing, BAC, London, 1992
Designs for Living, Drill Hall, London, 2001
Drag Act, Drill Hall, London, 1993
Easy Access (for the Boys), Drill Hall, London, 1998
Leaking From Every Orifice, BAC Main, London, 1994
Why Is John Lennon Wearing A Skirt?, Riverside, London, 1991
The Year of the Monkey, Studio 2, London, 2000
 Hardworking Families,  Kings Heath, Birmingham 2015

German-language publications 
Chaos, Merlin Verlag 2008,

References

External links
 homepage of Claire Dowie

1957 births
Living people
English women dramatists and playwrights
Actresses from Birmingham, West Midlands
English dramatists and playwrights